Wayne Walker is a New Zealand politician who is an Auckland councillor.

Political career

In 2000 Walker was elected to the Rodney District Council. He was re-elected in 2007 by just one vote. He is regarded as a Green politician.

In the 2010 Auckland Council elections Walker won a seat in the Albany ward. He was re-elected in 2013.

In 2016 Walker and his running mate, John Watson, were both re-elected to Council. They were both re-elected again in 2019 
and again (provisionally) in 2022.

References

External links
Official website

Living people
Auckland Councillors
New Zealand environmentalists
Rodney District Councillors
Year of birth missing (living people)